Conus magus, common name the magical cone, is a species of sea snail, a marine gastropod mollusk in the family Conidae, the cone snails and their allies.

Like all species within the genus Conus, these snails are predatory and venomous. Their venom contains conotoxins which have powerful neurotoxic effects. Given that they are capable of "stinging" humans, live cone shells should be handled with great care or preferably not at all.

The variety Conus magus var. decurtatus Dautzenberg, 1910 is a synonym of Conus striolatus Kiener, 1848

Description

The size of an adult shell varies between 16 mm and 94 mm. This common species is very variable in pattern and shade of coloring and embraces a large synonymy. The moderate spire is striate. The body whorl is long and rather cylindrical, closely striate below. The color of the shell is white, clouded with bluish ash, orange-brown, chestnut or chocolate, everywhere encircled by narrow chocolate interrupted lines, often separated into somewhat distant dots The middle of the body whorl is usually irregularly fasciate with white. The spire is tessellated with chestnut or chocolate.

Venom use
Ziconotide is a chemical derived from the Conus magus toxin that acts as a painkiller with a potency 1000 times that of morphine. Discovered by Dr. Baldomero Olivera at University of Utah, it was developed for treatment of chronic and intractable pain caused by AIDS, cancer, neurological disorders and other maladies, and was approved by the U.S. Food and Drug Administration in December 2004 under the name Prialt.

Ziconotide works by blocking calcium channels in pain-transmitting nerve cells, rendering them unable to transmit pain signals to the brain. It is administered through injection into the spinal fluid.

Distribution
This marine species occurs in the Red Sea and in the Indian Ocean off Madagascar and the Mascarene Basin. It is also found over a wide area of the Pacific Ocean from Indonesia to Japan and to the Marshall Islands, Wallis and Futuna and Fiji, but mainly centered on the Philippines; off Australia (Queensland).

References

 Linnaeus, C. (1758). Systema Naturae per regna tria naturae, secundum classes, ordines, genera, species, cum characteribus, differentiis, synonymis, locis. Editio decima, reformata. Laurentius Salvius: Holmiae. ii, 824 pp 
 Bernardi, A. B., 1860. Description d'une espèce nouvelle. Journal de Conchyliologie 8: 331–332
 Bruguière, M. 1792. Encyclopédie Méthodique ou par ordre de matières. Histoire naturelle des vers. Paris : Panckoucke Vol. 1 i–xviii, 757 pp.
 Röding, P.F. 1798. Museum Boltenianum sive Catalogus cimeliorum e tribus regnis naturae quae olim collegerat Joa. Hamburg : Trappii 199 pp. 
 Swainson, W. 1822. Zoological Illustrations; or Original Figures and Descriptions of new, rare, or interesting Animals, selected chiefly from the classes of Ornithology, Entomology, and Conchology, and arranged on the principles of Cuvier and other modern zoologists. Series 1. London : Baldwin, Cradock & Joy Vol. 3 pls 84–134.
 Reeve, L.A. 1843. Descriptions of new species of shells figured in the 'Conchologia Iconica'. Proceedings of the Zoological Society of London 11: 169–197
 Reeve, L.A. 1849. Monograph of the genus Conus. pls 4–9 in Reeve, L.A. (ed). Conchologia Iconica. London : L. Reeve & Co. Vol. 1. 
 Adams, A. 1854. Descriptions of new species of the Genus Conus, from the collection of Hugh Cuming, Esq. Proceedings of the Zoological Society of London 1853(21): 116–119
 Sowerby, G.B. 1857–1858. Monograph of the genus Conus. 1–56, pls 1–24 in Thesaurus conchyliorum or monographs of genera of shells. London : Sowerby Vol. 3. 
 Bernardi, M. 1860. Descriptions d'espèces nouvelles. Journal de Conchyliologie 8: 332 
 Boivin, A. 1864. Descriptions de cinq espèces nouvelles du genre Conus. Journal de Conchyliologie 12: 33–40
 Crosse, H. 1865. Description de cones nouveaux provenant de la collection Cuming. Journal de Conchyliologie 13: 299–315 
 Sowerby, G.B. 1866. Monograph of the genus Conus. pp. 328–329 in Thesaurus Conchyliorum, or monographs of genera of shells. London : Sowerby, G.B. Vol. 3. 
 Weinkauff, H.C. 1875. Conus. pp. 311–316 in Küster, H.C., Martini, F.W. & Chemnitz, J.H. (eds). Systematisches Conchylien-Cabinet von Martini und Chemnitz. Nürnberg : Bauer & Raspe Vol. 4.
 Smith, E.A. 1876. A list of marine shells, chiefly from the Solomon Islands, with descriptions of several new species. Journal of the Linnean Society of London, Zoology 12: 535–562, pl. 30 
 Oostingh, C.H. 1925. Report on a collection of recent shells from Obi and Halmahera, Molluccas. Mededeelingen van de Landbouwhoogeschool te Wageningen 29(1): 1–362 
 Demond, J. 1957. Micronesian reef associated gastropods. Pacific Science 11(3): 275–341, fig. 2, pl. 1
 Gillett, K. & McNeill, F. 1959. The Great Barrier Reef and Adjacent Isles: a comprehensive survey for visitor, naturalist and photographer. Sydney : Coral Press 209 pp.
 Rippingale, O.H. & McMichael, D.F. 1961. Queensland and Great Barrier Reef Shells. Brisbane : Jacaranda Press 210 pp.
 Cotton, B.C. 1964. Molluscs of Arnhem Land. Records of the American-Australian Scientific Expedition to Arnhem Land 4 (Zoology): 9–43
 Wilson, B.R. & Gillett, K. 1971. Australian Shells: illustrating and describing 600 species of marine gastropods found in Australian waters. Sydney : Reed Books 168 pp.
 Hinton, A. 1972. Shells of New Guinea and the Central Indo-Pacific. Milton : Jacaranda Press xviii 94 pp.
 Shikama, T. 1977. Descriptions of new and noteworthy [sic] Gastropoda from Western Oceans. Science Reports of the Yokohama National University 24(2): 9–23 
 Cernohorsky, W.O. 1978. Tropical Pacific Marine Shells. Sydney : Pacific Publications 352 pp., 68 pls.
 Motta, A.J. da 1982. Seventeen new cone shell names (Gastropoda: Conidae). Publicaçoes Ocasionais da Sociedade Portuguesa de Malacologia 1: 1–26
 Motta, A.J. da 1983. Two new species of the genus Conus (Gastropoda: Conidae). Publicaçoes Ocasionais da Sociedade Portuguesa de Malacologia 2: 1–9 
 Vine, P. (1986). Red Sea Invertebrates. Immel Publishing, London. 224 pp
 Wilson, B. 1994. Australian Marine Shells. Prosobranch Gastropods. Kallaroo, WA : Odyssey Publishing Vol. 2 370 pp.
-Röckel, D., Korn, W. & Kohn, A.J. 1995. Manual of the Living Conidae. Volume 1: Indo-Pacific Region. Wiesbaden : Hemmen 517 pp.
 Filmer R.M. (2001). A Catalogue of Nomenclature and Taxonomy in the Living Conidae 1758–1998. Backhuys Publishers, Leiden. 388pp
 Tucker J.K. (2009). Recent cone species database. 4 September 2009 Edition
 Tucker J.K. & Tenorio M.J. (2009) Systematic classification of Recent and fossil conoidean gastropods. Hackenheim: Conchbooks. 296 pp
 Puillandre N., Duda T.F., Meyer C., Olivera B.M. & Bouchet P. (2015). One, four or 100 genera? A new classification of the cone snails. Journal of Molluscan Studies. 81: 1–23

Gallery

External links
 The Conus Biodiversity website
 
 Cone Shells – Knights of the Sea
 Holotype in MNHN, Paris

magus
Gastropods described in 1758
Taxa named by Carl Linnaeus